Taitung is a railway station of Taiwan Railways Administration. It lies at the junction of the Hualien-Taitung line and the South-link line in Taitung City, Taitung County, Taiwan.

History
During the construction work of the back part of Taitung Station in 1980, a historic settlement area was discovered when graveyard containing several thousand slate coffins was unearthed, with some bodies still laid within. Around 20,000 pieces of jade, pottery and stone tools were also found. This had caught the attention of the government to carry out archaeological work and build a national museum to preserve the artifacts. The area officially opened in 1997 as the Beinan Cultural Park.

Structure

There are three island platforms. The station also features solar panels installed on 12 buildings within its parameters which covers an area of 8,652 m2 and an installed generation capacity of 1.51 MW.

Service
Currently a 1st Grade Station.
Most trains from Taipei Station terminate at this station whilst some continue on to Zhiben Station on the South-link Line.
Currently Train No 1 and 2 which goes around the entire Taiwan stops at this station to change locomotive head due to the lack of electrification on the South-link Line.
The station is equipped with elevators and escalators.

Around the station
 Beinan Cultural Park
 Taitung Forest Park

See also
 List of railway stations in Taiwan

References

External links

TRA Taitung Station 
TRA Taitung Station 

1982 establishments in Taiwan
Railway stations in Taitung County
Railway stations opened in 1982
Railway stations served by Taiwan Railways Administration